The Volkswagen Tarek is an off-road competition car produced by Volkswagen in 2003.

Technical specifications
The engine used in the car was a 218 HP 1.9 turbodiesel with 390 N m of torque. It was equipped with injector-pump direct injection and variable geometry turbine. The frame is tubular in steel and is covered with a carbon fiber body. The suspensions are double triangles on each side with coil springs and adjustable shock absorbers, while the installed rims are 16 'at the front and 15' at the rear. The gearbox that transmits the power to the traction is rear and five-speed manual. The tank is 250 liters.

Competition history
The Tarek, presented at the Essen Motor Show, was conceived to participate in the 2003 Dakar Rally. The drivers chosen were Jutta Kleinschmidt, Stéphane Henrard and Dieter Depping. At the end of the competition Henrard came in 6th place, while came Kleinschmidt in 8th.

References

Rally cars
Rally raid cars
Tarek
Cars introduced in 2003